Christina Sormani is a professor of mathematics at City University of New York affiliated with Lehman College and the CUNY Graduate Center. She is known for her research in  Riemannian geometry, metric geometry, and Ricci curvature, as well as her work on the notion of intrinsic flat distance.

Career
Sormani received her Ph.D. from New York University in 1996 under Jeff Cheeger. She then took postdoctoral positions at Harvard University (under Shing-Tung Yau) and Johns Hopkins University (under William Minicozzi II). Sormani now works at Lehman College in the City University of New York
and at the CUNY Graduate Center.

Awards and honors
In 2009, Sormani was an invited speaker at the Geometry Festival.

In 2015, Sormani became a fellow of the American Mathematical Society.

Selected publications
Sormani, Christina. (2000). Nonnegative Ricci curvature, small linear diameter growth and finite generation of fundamental groups. Journal of Differential Geometry, 54(3), 547–559. MR 1823314.
Sormani, Christina, & Wei, Guofang. Hausdorff convergence and universal covers. Transactions of the American Mathematical Society, 353 (2001), no. 9, 3585–3602. MR 1837249
Sormani, Christinam & Wei, Guofang. Universal covers for Hausdorff limits of noncompact spaces. Transactions of the American Mathematical Society, 356 (2004), no. 3, 1233–1270. MR 2021619
Sormani, Christina, & Wenger, Stefan. (2010). Weak convergence of currents and cancellation. Calculus of Variations and Partial Differential Equations, 38, 183–206. https://doi.org/10.1007/s00526-009-0282-x
 Lee, Dan A, & Sormani, Christina. (2014). Stability of the positive mass theorem for rotationally symmetric Riemannian manifolds. Journal für die reine und angewandte Mathematik (Crelles Journal) 686. https://doi.org/10.1515/crelle-2012-0094
Sormani, Christina, & Wenger, Stefan. (2011). The intrinsic flat distance between Riemannian manifolds and other integral current spaces." Journal of Differential Geometry, 87(1), 117–199. MR 2786592

References

Hunter College High School alumni
Living people
American women mathematicians
20th-century American mathematicians
21st-century American mathematicians
Fellows of the American Mathematical Society
Lehman College faculty
Graduate Center, CUNY faculty
City University of New York faculty
Differential geometers
20th-century women mathematicians
21st-century women mathematicians
Mathematicians from New York (state)
Year of birth missing (living people)
20th-century American women
21st-century American women